The International Union of Geological Sciences (IUGS) is an international non-governmental organization devoted to international cooperation in the field of geology.

About
The IUGS was founded in 1961 and is a Scientific Union member of the International Science Council (ISC), formerly the International Council for Science (ICSU), which it recognizes as the co-ordinating body for the international organization of science. Currently geologists from 121 countries (and regions) are represented in the IUGS. A broad range of scientific topics are covered by its commission, task groups, joint programmes and affiliated organizations. IUGS promotes and encourages the study of geological problems, especially those of worldwide significance, and supports and facilitates international and inter-disciplinary co-operation in the earth sciences. The Union's Secretariat is currently located at the Chinese Academy of Geological Sciences in Beijing, China.

Activities
IUGS is a joint partner with UNESCO for the International Geoscience Programme (IGCP) and also participates in the Global Geoparks Network (GGN). The Geological Society of London oversees the production and distribution of IUGS Publications. The Geological Society of India produces and distributes the Union's quarterly journal, entitled Episodes, as well as providing editorial support. Interested parties can download the latest issues of Episodes free of charge.

Commissions
IUGS runs seven international commissions, covering the following topics: 
 Commission for the Management and Application of Geoscience Information (CGI)
 Geoscience Education, Training and Technology Transfer (COGE)
 Geoscience for Environmental Management (GEM)
 International Commission on Stratigraphy (ICS)
 International Commission on the History of Geological Sciences (INHIGEO) 
 Commission on Tectonics and Structural Geology (TECTASK)
 Commission on Global Geochemical Baselines (CGGB)
The latter commission (CGGB) is the youngest: its establishment was approved on 31 August 2016 in Cape Town at the Fourth Ordinary Session of the IUGS Council meeting. It had been a task group since 1998, with a precursor existing since 1988.

International Geological Congress

The International Union of Geological Sciences is the main scientific sponsor of the International Geological Congress (IGC), which takes place every four years. The first congress was in France in 1878 where a few geoscientists gathered to share new finds and the aim was to create a framework and a platform for geoscientists to meet at regular intervals. The event has been growing bigger with each congress.

Brisbane hosted the 34th congress in August 2012 and Cape Town the 35th in 2016. Delhi was to host the 36th in March 2020 as a collaborative effort by Bangladesh, India, Nepal, Pakistan and Sri Lanka. Because of Covid, the congress has been postponed twice and is currently re-scheduled for August 2021. Its theme is to be "Geosciences:The Basic Science for a Sustainable Future".

First 100 IUGS Geological Heritage Sites
To celebrate the sixtieth anniversary of its establishment, in October 2022 IUGS published a list of 100 sites around the world that it holds to be significant in the development of the earth sciences.

Awards
The IUGS Scientific Awards of Excellence:
 IUGS – Émile Argand Award
 IUGS – James M. Harrison Award
 IUGS – Award for Geoscience Information
 IUGS – Award for Structural Geology
 Vladimir V. Tikhomirov History of Geology Medal by the IUGS Commission on the History of Geology (INHIGEO). 
 Digby McLaren Medal by the IUGS Commission on Stratigraphy (ICS).

See also
QAPF diagram

References

External links
 International Union of Geological Sciences website
 International Year of Planet Earth website
 International Geoscience Programme website
 International Chronostratigraphic Chart
 International Stratigraphic Guide: A guide developed by the IUGS-ICS Subcommission on Stratigraphic Classification to promote international agreement on principles of stratigraphic classification and to develop an internationally acceptable stratigraphic terminology and rules of stratigraphic procedure.
 List of IUGS-affiliated organizations
 First 100 IUGS Geological Heritage Sites

 
Geology organizations
International scientific organizations
Members of the International Council for Science
Scientific organizations established in 1961
Members of the International Science Council